Lobuche (or Lobuje) is a small settlement near Mount Everest in the Khumbu region of Nepal. It is one of the last overnight stops with lodging on the "trail to base camp", a hike that climbers make on their way to Everest Base Camp (South) when attempting an ascent of Everest via the standard southeast route. It is also a popular stop among trekkers in the area. From there they can complete the trail on to EBC or stop at Gorak Shep, the last stop with lodging on the trail, and climb the modest nearby peak, Kala Patthar (5,545 m, 18,192 ft), for a rare view of the Everest summit. The structure of Everest is such that its actual summit is not visible from Base Camp.

It shares its name with several peaks in the area: Lobuche Far East, Lobuche East and Lobuche West (a separate mountain further west). Labuche Kang (sometimes spelled Lobuche Kang) is not local but is in Tibet.
 
Lobuche is a particularly busy place each year in the month of April as hundreds of porters and Sherpas from the region pass through Lobuche on their way to Base Camp. Many of them also move supplies, with the aid of yaks or other means, for various climbers and expeditions also traveling up the trail in preparation for the Everest spring climbing season in May.

The lodging accommodations at Lobuche are notoriously primitive, consisting mostly of stone huts with shared bunk dormitories. In recent years there have been some additions of more modern facilities and amenities including seven lodges providing 200 twin-bed rooms. Some lodges provide internet and oxygen services.

Gallery

References

Populated places in Solukhumbu District
Tourism in Nepal
Khumbu Pasanglhamu